Vanessa Lowery Brown (born December 16, 1965) is a former Democratic member of the Pennsylvania House of Representatives from the 190th District. She is a member of the Pennsylvania Legislative Black Caucus. In 2018 she was convicted on seven charges related to a bribery case, six of which were felonies. She was sentenced to 23 months probation for her crimes. In 2023, Brown became employed in the office of the Philadelphia Register of Wills.

Background
Brown attended Philadelphia High School for Girls, graduating in 1984. She then studied at the Community College of Philadelphia followed by Howard University. She is single.

Bribery case
On 31 October 2018 Brown was convicted on seven charges stemming relating to bribery. She was found guilty of five felony counts of violating the state conflict-of-interest law, a felony count of bribery, and a further misdemeanor count relating to failure to report payments. The charges resulted from a sting operation which was controversially shut down by Democrat Pennsylvania Attorney General Kathleen Kane who had claimed the investigations could not produce cases that were winnable in court. On 30 November 2018 Brown was sentenced to 23 months probation for her crimes.
Despite her bribery conviction, she refused to resign from her position. However, on 12 December, Brown resigned from her seat "under protest".

Brown was represented at trial by Patrick A. Casey, John B. Dempsey and Erik R. Anderson of the Scranton-based law firm, Myers, Brier & Kelly, LLP.

References

External links
Pennsylvania House of Representatives - Vanessa Lowery Brown (Democrat) official PA House website
Pennsylvania House Democratic Caucus - Vanessa L. Brown official Party website

Living people
Democratic Party members of the Pennsylvania House of Representatives
Women state legislators in Pennsylvania
African-American state legislators in Pennsylvania
African-American women in politics
Politicians from Philadelphia
21st-century American politicians
21st-century American women politicians
Pennsylvania politicians convicted of crimes
Pennsylvania politicians convicted of corruption
Philadelphia High School for Girls alumni
Criminals from Pennsylvania
21st-century American criminals
Howard University alumni
American female criminals
1965 births
Community College of Philadelphia alumni
21st-century African-American women
21st-century African-American politicians
20th-century African-American people
20th-century African-American women